
Gmina Świedziebnia is a rural gmina (administrative district) in Brodnica County, Kuyavian-Pomeranian Voivodeship, in north-central Poland.

The gmina contains part of the protected area called Górzno-Lidzbark Landscape Park.

Villages
Gmina Świedziebnia contains the villages and settlements of Brodniczka, Chlebowo, Dzierzno, Granaty, Grzęby, Janowo, Kłuśno, Księte, Mełno, Michałki, Niemojewo, Nowa Rokitnica, Nowe Zasady, Okalewko, Ostrów, Rokitnica-Wieś, Stare Zasady, Świedziebnia, Zasadki and Zduny.

Neighbouring gminas
Gmina Świedziebnia is bordered by the gminas of Bartniczka, Brodnica, Górzno, Lubowidz, Osiek, Rypin and Skrwilno.

References

Polish official population figures 2006

Swiedziebnia
Brodnica County